Göynük District is a district of the Bolu Province of Turkey. Its seat is the town of Göynük. Its area is 1,407 km2, and its population is 14,679 (2021).

Composition
There is one municipality in Göynük District:
 Göynük

There are 66 villages in Göynük District:

 Ahmetbeyler
 Akçaalan
 Aksaklar
 Alanköy
 Arıkçayırı
 Arızlar
 Aşağıkınık
 Bayındır
 Bekirfakılar
 Bölücekova
 Boyacılar
 Bozcaarmut
 Bulanık
 Çamlıca
 Çapar
 Çatacık
 Çayköy
 Çaylakköy
 Ceylanlı
 Çubukköy
 Dağhacılar
 Dağşeyhleri
 Dedeler
 Değirmenözü
 Demirhanlar
 Ekinciler
 Gerişler
 Gökçesaray
 Güneyçalıca
 Gürpınar
 Hacımahmut
 Hasanlar
 Hilaller
 Himmetoğlu
 Hisarözü
 İbrahimözü
 Karaaliler
 Karaardıç
 Karacalar
 Kaşıkçışeyhler
 Kayabaşı
 Kayalıdere
 Kılavuzlar
 Kilciler
 Kızılkuyu
 Köybaşı
 Kozcağız
 Kumcuk
 Kürnüç
 Kuyupınar
 Memeceler
 Mustanlar
 Narzanlar
 Örencik
 Pelitcik
 Sarıcalar
 Sarılar
 Soğukçam
 Sünnet
 Susuz
 Tekirler
 Tepebaşı
 Umurlar
 Yeniköy
 Yeşilyazı
 Yukarıkınık

References

Districts of Bolu Province